Javier "Javi" Villar Rey (born 20 February 1991) is a Spanish professional footballer who plays for Real Avilés CF as a midfielder.

Club career
Born in Pontevedra, Galicia, Rey played youth football with hometown club Pontevedra CF. In late 2008 he made his debut as a senior at the age of only 17 and, the following summer, moved to Valencia CF to complete his development; during the 2009–10 season, he appeared in one game for the reserves also in the Segunda División B.

In July 2011, Rey signed a contract with CD Lugo. He contributed 22 appearances in his debut campaign (18 starts, 1,622 minutes of action), as the team returned to Segunda División after an absence of 20 years.

Rey made his debut as a professional on 1 December 2012, appearing as a late substitute in a 1–2 home loss against FC Barcelona B. On 18 July 2013 he joined RC Celta de Vigo, being initially assigned to the reserve side in the third tier.

In the following seasons, Rey all but competed in division three, with CD Guijuelo, UD Logroñés, CD Badajoz, UCAM Murcia CF and Racing de Ferrol (with the last of those clubs, he also had a very brief spell in the Tercera División).

References

External links

1991 births
Living people
Spanish footballers
Footballers from Pontevedra
Association football midfielders
Segunda División players
Segunda División B players
Tercera División players
Segunda Federación players
Pontevedra CF footballers
Valencia CF Mestalla footballers
CD Lugo players
Celta de Vigo B players
RC Celta de Vigo players
CD Guijuelo footballers
UD Logroñés players
CD Badajoz players
UCAM Murcia CF players
Racing de Ferrol footballers
Real Avilés CF footballers